= Blue Inferior =

Japanese manga series

- Cover of Blue Inferior volume 1 as published by Kadokawa Shoten

ブルー・インフェリア (Burū Infiria)
- Genre: Adventure
- Manga
- Written by: Kyoko Shitō
- Published by: Kadokawa Shoten
- English publisher: NA: ADV Manga
- Magazine: Kibou Comics
- Original run: 1998 – present
- Volumes: 4

Blue Inferior (Japanese: ブルー・インフェリア, Hepburn: Burū Infiria) is a manga created by Kyoko Shitō. The manga was serialised in Kadokawa Shoten's Kibou Comics. The manga is licensed in English by ADV Manga.

== Plot ==
Because of the environmental pollution, the Earth has become a contaminated desert, there are only patches of land. Some to be said to be inhabited by "sub-humans", contaminated people. However, there are a few areas along the shore where normal people live, but they've become suspicious of strangers, and know nothing of the people of the outside world.

One day, a young girl named Marine washes up on the shore of one of the inhabited lands. She has no memory of where she came from. She is found by a young boy named Kazuya, who loves the sea and has a natural curiosity about the outside world. The two of them become friends but then rumors start spreading that Marine might be a sub-human, and she is locked up. Now Kazuya must help her escape, and uncover the mystery of who she is and where she came from.

== Characters ==
Kazuya (age 14)
Kazuya is an orphan, his parents left on an expedition and were never seen again. He owns a small boat and often adventures out to the ocean on it, which sometimes gets him into trouble. He finds Marine when she is washed up onto the seashore. He helps her to remember her past, which she has forgotten. His parents' names are Yuya and Mariko.
Marine (age 13)
Marine is washed ashore, and unknown to all treated by the doctor, who came to Kazuya's village from another place. She cries a lot and is supposed to find Kazuya's parents. When she first arrives she can remember nothing, but Kazuya helps her to remember things. She is a subhuman, and special because her blood is saving the life of Risee.

Risee (age 17)
Risee is sick with a disease that has disabled his legs. He has a very bright outlook on life and although his personality is greatly different from Kazuya's, Kazuya likes to talk about his troubles with Risee. The doctor has sworn to cure Risee's disease, and has begun to heal him with Marine's blood.
